Sandra Marlene Ruddick (née Anderson; September 3, 1932 – October 10, 2017) was an American artistic gymnast. She competed at the 1956 Summer Olympics with the best individual result of 46th place on the vault and uneven bars. Sandra was married to Robert Ruddick Jr and had 3 Children; Dave Ruddick, Kathi Ruddick-Waite, and Robert Ruddick. She remarried Al John, she has a step-son Leo and Step daughter MaryAnn. In 2012 she was inducted into the Indiana Gymnastics Hall of Fame.

References

1932 births
2017 deaths
Sportspeople from Indianapolis
Gymnasts at the 1956 Summer Olympics
Olympic gymnasts of the United States
American female artistic gymnasts
21st-century American women